The FIVB Youth and Junior World Rankings is a ranking system for men's and women's age-group (U- categories) national teams in volleyball. The teams of the member nations of Fédération Internationale de Volleyball (FIVB), volleyball's world governing body, are ranked based on their ranking in each FIVB appointed international tournaments, like the previous senior world ranking system. The rankings are used in international competitions to define the seeded teams and arrange them in pools. Specific procedures for seeding and pooling are established by the FIVB in each competition's formula, but the method usually employed is the serpentine system.

The FIVB Youth and Junior World Rankings are composed of:
FIVB Youth World Rankings for boy's under-19 and women's under-18
FIVB Junior World Rankings for men's under-21 and women's under-20
while FIVB under-23 World Rankings are dissolved.

Calculation method
The system of point attribution for the selected FIVB World and Official Competitions below is as follows:
World Championship final and qualifying tournaments: included for 2 years and points are also granted for the qualification matches, to the best non-qualified teams.
Continental Championship final and qualifying tournaments: included for 2 years and points are also granted for the qualification matches, to the best non-qualified teams.

Points for final qualifiers

Examples
These are example how world ranking works.

FIVB Junior World Rankings

FIVB Youth World Rankings

Notes and references

 

World Rankings
Volleyball-related lists
Sports world rankings